Crocker Island is an island located by Johnson City, New York, on the Susquehanna River.

References

River islands of New York (state)
Landforms of Broome County, New York
Islands of the Susquehanna River in Pennsylvania
Islands of Pennsylvania